These are the list of awards and nominations received by South Korean girl group Apink.


Awards and nominations

Other accolades

Listicles

References

Awards
Apink